Akrab may refer to:
 Akrab, Kazakhstan
 Aqrab, Syria
 Beta Scorpii, a star